The 2014–15 Swedish Figure Skating Championships were held at the ABB Arena Nord in Västeräs between December 10 and 14, 2014. Skaters competed in the disciplines of men's singles and ladies' singles on the senior, junior, and novice levels. The results were among the criteria used to choose the teams to the 2015 World Championships and 2015 European Championships.

Senior results

Men

Ladies

External links
 2014–15 Swedish Championships results

Swedish Figure Skating Championships 2014-2015
Swedish Figure Skating Championships 2014-2015
Swedish Figure Skating Championships
Figure Skating Championships 2014-2015
Figure Skating Championships 2014-2015
Sports competitions in Västerås